Brandon J. Duckworth (born January 23, 1976) is an American former professional baseball pitcher, who is currently a scout. He played in Major League Baseball (MLB) for the Philadelphia Phillies, Houston Astros, and Kansas City Royals, and in Nippon Professional Baseball (NPB) for the Tohoku Rakuten Golden Eagles. Since 2014, Duckworth has worked for the New York Yankees professional scouting department.

Career
Duckworth graduated from Kearns High School in Kearns, Utah, in 1994. He attended the College of Southern Idaho and California State University, Fullerton. In 1997, he played collegiate summer baseball with the Brewster Whitecaps of the Cape Cod Baseball League.

On August 13, 1997, Duckworth signed with the Philadelphia Phillies as an amateur free agent. He made his MLB debut with the Phillies on August 7, 2001, in a home game versus the San Diego Padres, at Philadelphia's Veterans Stadium. From 2001 through 2003, Duckworth compiled a 15–18 win–loss record. On November 3, 2003, the Phillies traded Duckworth, along with minor leaguers Taylor Buchholz and Ezequiel Astacio, to the Houston Astros for Billy Wagner. After spending the next two years in Houston, with limited playing time, Duckworth signed as a free agent with the Pittsburgh Pirates, in December 2005.

Without playing for the Pirates in 2006, Duckworth was traded by Pittsburgh to the Kansas City Royals for cash considerations. In his first two seasons with the Royals, his record was 4–10 with a 5.37 earned run average (ERA). In 2007, Duckworth picked up the only save of his MLB career, going 3 innings of shutout baseball to close out a 8–3 victory over the Mariners. He held down the win for starter Gil Meche. 

In January 2008, Duckworth was designated for assignment by the Royals to make room on the organizational roster for free agent signee Brett Tomko. Duckworth passed through waivers, and on February 1, the Royals announced that he had accepted an assignment to the Triple-A Omaha Royals. On August 24, 2008, Duckworth was recalled by Kansas City to start; in his first game, he went 5 innings, giving up 3 earned runs, and was credited with the win. In October 2009, Duckworth was granted free agency.

In January 2010, Duckworth signed a minor league contract to play with the Phillies organization.

In December 2010, Duckworth signed a minor league contract with the Boston Red Sox. On July 25, 2012, the Red Sox granted his release, so he could play in Japan. Duckworth pitched for the Tohoku Rakuten Golden Eagles of Nippon Professional Baseball in 2012 and 2013.

After the 2013 season, Duckworth joined the New York Yankees as a scout. As of 2019, he remained in the employ of the Yankees professional scouting department.

References

External links

Brandon Duckworth at Pura Pelota (Venezuelan Professional Baseball League)

1976 births
Living people
Águilas del Zulia players
American expatriate baseball players in Japan
Baseball players from Salt Lake City
Brewster Whitecaps players
Cal State Fullerton Titans baseball players
Clearwater Phillies players
Houston Astros players
Indianapolis Indians players
Kansas City Royals players
Lehigh Valley IronPigs players
Major League Baseball pitchers
Navegantes del Magallanes players
American expatriate baseball players in Venezuela
New Orleans Zephyrs players
New York Yankees scouts
Omaha Royals players
Pawtucket Red Sox players
Philadelphia Phillies players
Piedmont Boll Weevils players
Reading Phillies players
Round Rock Express players
Scranton/Wilkes-Barre Red Barons players
Southern Idaho Golden Eagles baseball players
Tohoku Rakuten Golden Eagles players
Wilmington Blue Rocks players
People from Kearns, Utah
Mat-Su Miners players